George Chiriac (born October 30, 1979 in Bârlad) is a former Romanian rugby union player. He played as a flanker.

Club career
During his career, Chiriac played for RC Bârlad, Politehnica Iași, RCJ Farul Constanța in Romania and for Rumilly, RC Orléans, RC Compiégnois and RC Beauvais in France.

International career
Chiriac gathered 20 caps for Romania, from his debut in 1996 against Belgium to his last game in 2003 against Namibia. He was a member of his national side for the 6th  Rugby World Cup in 2003, where he played all four matches in Pool A against Ireland, Australia, Argentina and Namibia, which was also his final match for the Oaks. He scored two tries for his national team, 10 points on aggregate.

References

External links

1979 births
Living people
Romanian rugby union players
Romania international rugby union players
Rugby union flankers
RCJ Farul Constanța players
CS Politehnica Iași (rugby union) players
RC Orléans players
Sportspeople from Bârlad
Expatriate rugby union players in France